Pascal Ickx (born March 30, 1937, in Lubbeek) is a Belgian former racing driver that competed on circuits for Grand Touring sports cars in the 1960s.

He is the son of the gentleman-driver and journalist Jacques Ickx, and the older brother of Jacky Ickx.

Racing career

Pascal Ickx's first appearance in racing came in the late 1950s where he made an appearance in the 1959 Liège-Rome-Liège driving a Saab. The following year in 1960, he would appear in the Liège-Rome-Liège again driving a BMW 700. That same year, he would drive in the 12 Hours of Huy finishing 32nd. He also made several appearances in World Rally Cars, most notably the ADAC Rallye Tour d'Europe in 1963 driving a Fiat 2300.

Racing record

Career summary
Liège-Rome-Liège, DNF, 1959
Liège-Rome-Liège, DNF, 1960
12 Hours of Huy, 32nd, 1960
Tour de France Automobile, 11th, 1962
Liège-Sofia-Liège, DNF, 1962
Coupe des Alpes, DNF, 1962
Rally Acropolis, 5th, 1962
ADAC Rallye Tour d'Europe, 1963
Tour de France Automobile, DNF, 1963
Int. AvD-Rallye Wiesbaden Deutschlandrallye, DNF, 1963
Rallye International des Routes du Nord, 1st (GT Class), 1963
Internationale Tulpenrallyem, 11th, 1965

Other ventures
He became a full-time journalist in the mid-1960s after retiring from racing. He used to serve as a reserve officer in the Belgian Army.

Personal life
Ickx married to Ornella Spinzze in Turin, Italy in 1964.

References

1937 births
Belgian racing drivers
Living people